Alfred des Essarts (9 August 1811 – 18 May 1893) was a 19th-century French poet, translator, playwright and writer, the father of Emmanuel des Essarts.

Biography
A curator at the Bibliothèque Sainte-Geneviève in Paris, a journalist at La France littéraire and L'Écho français, he was also author of feuilletons, novels, songs and poems. His plays were staged at the Théâtre-Français and at the Théâtre du Vaudeville.

He also translated from Russian for Éditions Franck the memoirs of Princess Dashkova, and from English for Hachette, several works by Charles Dickens such as The Life and Adventures of Martin Chuzzlewit and The Old Curiosity Shop.

Works

1830: Le Donjon de Vincennes, Les Marchands de nouveautés
1837: 1812. Le Prisonnier de guerre en Russie, Poussielgue
1841: Influence de la civilisation chrétienne en Orient, poetry, Maulde et Renou
1841: Une Perle dans la mer, novel, 2 vols, Lachapelle
1842: Le Lord bohémien, 2 vols, Ch. Lachapelle
1843: Le Monument de Molière, poetry, Lange-Lévy et Cie
1843: Le Pénitent, legend, Lange-Lévy
1844: Le Chant de la syrène, melody, music by Oscar Comettant
1845: Sous les ombrages, simples tales, Librairie Louis Janet
1846: Adhémar, feuilleton in La Patrie
1846: Les Chants de la jeunesse, followed by Livre des pleurs, poems, Librairie Louis Janet
1846: Jeanne d'Arc, scène et air, music by Comettant
1846: Une Mésalliance, feuilleton
1846: La Plainte d'Ariane, dramatic melody for soprano, music by Comettant
1847: Andréas et Béatrice, histoire vénitienne, feuilleton in La Sylphide
1847: L'Univers illustré, géographie vivante, Librairie Louis Janet
1848: La Pervenche, livre des salons, with Marie Aycard and Émile Deschamps, Librairie Louis Janet
1849: Frère et sœur, Arpin
1849: Un Héros de roman, feuilleton
1849: Le Trésor de l'émigré, feuilleton
1849: La Ligue des amants, one-act comedy, in verse, 1849
1850: Julie de Fenestranges, feuilleton
1850: Marcello, feuilleton
1851: La Comédie du monde, Comptoir des imprimeurs-unis
1851: Une Invasion de cosaques, feuilleton, de Vigny
1852: Annunziata, De Vigny
1852: Sélim, feuilleton
1853: La Gerbe, by Soye and Bouchet
1853: La Noix dorée, one-act comédie en vaudevilles, with Lucien Duval,
1854: Récits historiques, Le Clère
1855: Portraits biographiques et critiques des hommes de la guerre d'Orient, Garnier frères
1855: Les Cœurs dévoués, Jourdan
1855: Légendes célestes, Le Clère : Reichel et Cie
1855: Sous la neige, chacun son récit, with Philibert Audebrand, Jules Rostaing, Maurice Alhoy and Louise Leneveux, Librairie Louis Janet
1856: Les Restes de saint Augustin rapportés à Hippone, poem, by Soye et Bouchet
1856: La Femme de l'espion, feuilleton
1857: La Petite Poucette, true story, Librairie Louis Janet
1857: Dix peintres célèbres, Le Clère
1858: Les Masques d'or, roman de mœurs contemporaines, Leleux
1858: Le Tour du cadran, simples récits, Vermot
1858: François de Médicis, historical novel, Hachette
1858: Neuf peintres célèbres, 2nd series, Le Clère
1859: Lectures d'hiver, Le Clère
1859: La Poursuite de l'Idéal, comédie fantastique
1860: Le Marché aux consciences, Lécrivain and Toubon
1861: La Guerre des frères, Poulet-Malassis
1861: Une Petite-fille de Robinson, Librairie Louis Janet
1862: Contes pompadours, Dentu
1862: Les Célébrités françaises, Vermot
1862: Les Deux veuves, Maillet
1862: Les Grands peintres, Vermot
1862: Les Fêtes de nos pères, Dupray de La Mahérie
1863: Valentin, ou la Femme du mousse, Librairie Louis Janet
1863: Le Père la Morale, veillées de village, Martinet
1863: Souffrir c'est vaincre, Dupray de La Mahérie
1864: Guignol, livre de la jeunesse, Dupray de La Mahérie
1864: Les Grands inventeurs anciens et modernes, Magnin, Blanchard et Cie
1865: Le Champ de roses, récit de village, E. Maillet
1866: Marthe, E. Maillet
1867: Le Roman des mères, feuilleton in Le Figaro
1868: Chanson d'une mère !, berceuse, music by Joseph O'Kelly
1868: Le Marquis de Roquefeuille, Maillet
1869: La Richesse des pauvres, followed by Mau-Jaunens, légende limousine, Bray
1869: Le Champ de roses, village story, Dillet
1870: L'Enfant volé, 2 vol, Vaton frères
1870: La Force des faibles, Dillet
1870: Les Masques d'or, Novel of contemporary mores, Lachaud
1877: Le Meneur de loups, village story, Lecoffre fils
1879: Le Roman d'un vieux garçon, Olmer
1879: Triste sommeil, triste réveil, music by Jean-Baptiste Weckerlin, Durand, Schoenewerk & Cie
1880: Récits légendaires, Mame
1882: Pulcinella, reflet d'Italie, Grand-Montrouge: Librairie d'éducation
1882: De l'Aube à la nuit, Pétrot-Garnier
1882: La Grâce d'un père, Grand-Montrouge: Librairie d'éducation
1884: La Muse du Sonnet, sonnets, with Clovis Hugues and Achille Millien
1892: L'Ame du violon, Hatier
1892: Le Soir, birds' songs, with Charles Lopis, music by Aloÿs Claussmann

Bibliography
 Gustave Vapereau, Dictionnaire universel des contemporains, 1893, (p. 457)
 Henri Mondor, Lloyd James Austin, Correspondance : 1862-1871 de Stéphane Mallarmé, Gallimard, 1959, (p. 307)

References

External links
 Alfred Des Essarts on Wikisource
 Alfred Des Essarts on Médias 19
 Alfred Des Essarts on Babelio
 Alfred Des Essarts on The Online Books Page
 Alfred Des Essarts on IMSLP

1811 births
1893 deaths
19th-century French dramatists and playwrights
19th-century French novelists
19th-century French poets
English–French translators
Russian–French translators
Writers from Paris
19th-century translators